Kara Marlene Stein is an American attorney who currently serves as a board member of the Public Company Accounting Oversight Board, known as PCAOB. She was sworn in on November 18, 2021, and her current term is scheduled to end on October 24, 2026.  

Stein also served on the U.S. Securities and Exchange Commission (SEC) from August 2013 till January 2019. In May 2013, President Barack Obama nominated her to serve as a Democratic member of the Commission to succeed Elisse Walter. Stein was confirmed by the Senate and started her tenure at the SEC in August 2013. During her tenure on the SEC, Stein was often described as the most progressive member of the body, and has been described as an ally of Senator Elizabeth Warren. In 2021, she was mentioned as a potential candidate to lead the Office of the Comptroller of the Currency (OCC).

Education and career
Stein graduated from Yale University in 1986 and Yale Law School in 1991. Following her education, Stein was an associate at the law firm Wilmer, Cutler & Pickering (WilmerHale).

Before being appointed to the SEC, Stein was an aide to Democratic Senator Jack Reed of Rhode Island and helped write the 2010 Dodd-Frank Act.

Securities and Exchange Commission (SEC)
Though soft-spoken in public, Stein took aggressive stances behind the scenes in pushing for strict investor protection rules at SEC.

Stein sparked a debate at the SEC and in Congress over the routine issuance of waivers to companies that had previously been sanctioned by prosecutors for financial misconduct.

In April 2014, Stein published a lengthy dissent to an SEC corporate waiver granted to The Royal Bank of Scotland Group (RBS), which had previously been charged by the Justice Department with criminal violations. Stein argued that the SEC waiver for RBS risked establishing a policy "that some firms are just too big to bar."

The dissent won applause from Democratic Senators Sherrod Brown and Elizabeth Warren. Again in an April 2015 speech, Warren criticized the SEC's policy of granting "Well-Known Seasoned Issuer" waivers, saying the agency misses an opportunity to deter bad behavior when it rubber-stamps these waivers.

But Republicans at the SEC bristled at the use of waivers as another enforcement tool. Stein subsequently dissented to SEC waivers granted to BNP Paribas, Citigroup, and Oppenheimer & Co.

Post-SEC career 
After departing the SEC and prior to her appointment to PCAOB, Stein served on the faculty of several law schools, including serving as a Lecturer on Law at Harvard Law School, Lecturer-in-Law at University of Pennsylvania Law School, and Director of the AI & Capital Markets Initiative for the Center for Innovation at UC Hastings College of Law. Stein served on the ten-member Financial Stability Task Force coordinated by the Brookings Institution and University of Chicago Booth School of Business. She was also a member of the Board of Directors of the Investors Exchange but resigned when she joined PCAOB.

References 

21st-century American politicians
Living people
Members of the U.S. Securities and Exchange Commission
Yale College alumni
Yale Law School alumni
Year of birth missing (living people)
Obama administration personnel
Trump administration personnel
University of Pennsylvania Law School faculty